Euphaedra pervaga, the Cameroon pink forester, is a butterfly in the family Nymphalidae. It is found in Cameroon. The habitat consists of forests.

References

Butterflies described in 1996
pervaga
Endemic fauna of Cameroon
Butterflies of Africa